Hypercompe eridanus is a moth of the family Erebidae first described by Pieter Cramer in 1775. It is found in Colombia, Suriname, and French Guiana.

Larvae have been recorded feeding on Cissus, Citrus, Erythrina, Ipomoea, Musa, Panicum, and Vanilla species.

References

Hypercompe
Moths described in 1775
Taxa named by Pieter Cramer